A safety management system (SMS) is designed to manage safety risk in the workplace, occupational safety being defined as the reduction of risk to a level that is as low as is reasonably practicable (ALARP) to prevent people getting hurt.

Description
A SMS provides a systematic way to continuously identify and monitor hazards and control risks while maintaining assurance that these risk controls are effective. SMS can be defined as:

...a businesslike approach to safety. It is a systematic, explicit and comprehensive process for managing safety risks. As with all management systems, a safety management system provides for goal setting, planning, and measuring performance. A safety management system is woven into the fabric of an organization. It becomes part of the culture, the way people do their jobs.

There are three imperatives for adopting a safety management system for a business – these are ethical, legal and financial. There is an implied moral obligation placed upon an employer to ensure that work activities and the place of work are safe; there are legislative requirements defined in every jurisdiction on how this is to be achieved and there is a substantial body of evidence which shows that effective safety management can reduce the financial exposure and damage to the reputation of an organisation by reducing accidents.

To address these three important elements, an effective SMS should:

 Define how the organisation is set up to manage risk.
 Identify workplace risk and implement suitable controls.
 Implement effective communications across all levels of the organisation.
 Implement a process to identify and correct non-conformity and non-compliance issues.
 Implement a continual improvement process.

The foundation to an effective safety management system is that of effective risk management. The defined process within an organisation for the identification, assessment, evaluation and control (or risk treatment) of risk will be key, must be carefully considered and then documented within the safety management system. As with safety management, there are a number of risk management models that can be used depending on the risk profile of an organisation, but the internationally recognised standard ISO 31000 - Risk management – Guidelines  is a common starting point. Interestingly, there is no reference to safety within the standard.

Historical context

Safety management evolved as a counterweight to the exploitation of workers in industry through the 19th and 20th centuries. As the industrial revolution opened up substantial commercial opportunities in Western societies, the financial imperative of business owners and industrialists lead to the use of an exploited, unskilled and uneducated workforce including child labour and rural migrant workers, often in working conditions where injury and death were day to day occurrences.

It became the remit of legislators with a social conscience to understand that governments had a moral and legal responsibility to protect workers using general and industry specific safety legislation. In the UK, the early 19th century Factory Acts were a significant development for gradually improving occupational safety through the decades, in fact the last iteration was made in 1961. This evolving environment was also the driving force behind the formation of the trade union or labour union movements and worker representation in the early 19th century across Europe and America which developed through the decades into representation in wage and working condition negotiations, but also in protecting the health, safety and welfare of workers.

One clear example of how unsafe and dangerous work conditions had become during the industrial revolution can be seen in this extract relating to an early 20th century mining disaster in West Virginia, USA.

<blockquote>As the 19th century closed out and the 20th century began, West Virginia had become a more dangerous place to mine than most.

West Virginia fell far behind other major coal-producing states in regulating mining conditions. Between 1890 and 1912, West Virginia had a higher mine death rate than any other state. West Virginia was the site of numerous deadly coal mining accidents, including the nation's worst coal disaster. On December 6, 1907, an explosion at a mine owned by the Fairmont Coal Company in Monongah, Marion County, killed 361. One historian has suggested that during World War I, a U.S. soldier had a better statistical chance of surviving in battle than did a West Virginian working in the coal mines.

The drivers that were to positively influence mine safety as the 20th century progressed included; improvements in mining legislation with regulatory oversight and in occupational health and safety legislation, involvement by trade unions to improve workers’ rights and working conditions, developments in mining technologies and a more general acceptance in wider society that such high levels of fatalities were no longer acceptable.</blockquote>

As research into occupational medicine improved, it had become possible to start to identify industrial diseases and illnesses caused by exposure to industry specific hazards such as coal dust in mining (miners black lung or Coalworker's pneumoconiosis), asbestos in construction (asbestosis and mesothelioma), exposure to physical agents such as occupational noise from industrial machinery (hearing loss, tinnitus or deafness) and vibration hazards from tools and equipment (hand-arm vibration syndrome and vibration white finger). These disabling and often fatal hazard vectors could then be targeted by legislation to reduce worker exposure to these dangerous substances and activities.

As more industry specific and general safety, health and welfare related legislation started to be introduced, it became necessary for employers to have a framework within which these safety regulations could be understood, managed and the legal requirements implemented. This was necessary, not just to comply with regulations but to also avoid fines and legal costs for non-compliance, increased insurance and workers compensation costs due to accidents and especially in the U.S. increasingly expensive criminal and civil liability lawsuits for death and injury caused at work.

Basic safety management components

International Labour Organization SMS model
The ILO guidance document is one of the most basic and adaptable models for organisations to utilise when developing a safety management system. In the ILO guidance document, the basic safety management components are:

 Policy – Establish within policy statements the requirements for sufficient resources; define top management commitment and state occupational safety and health (OSH) targets.
 Organizing – How is the organization structured; how is responsibility and accountability defined; how does the organisation communicate internally and externally; what documentation is required and how is training and competency defined.
 Planning and Implementation – How does the organisation plan for, develop and implement its approach to risk management; how are hazards identified and risk effectively managed; what goals and objectives are set to drive OHS performance and measure progress; what arrangements are made for contingency and emergency situations. 
 Evaluation – How is OSH performance measured and assessed; what is the processes for the reporting and investigation of accidents and incidents; what internal and external audit processes are in place to review and verify the system.
 Action for Improvement – How are corrective and preventive action created, managed and closed out; what processes are in place to ensure the continual improvement process. 

Although other safety management models may use different terminology, the basic components and workflow for safety management systems will be the same. The desired outcome is an effective Plan, Do, Check, Act (PDCA) process where the goal is that of continual and measurable improvement.

Regulatory perspective

Implications
A SMS is intended to act as a business administration structure for an organization to effectively meet its legal obligations under applicable occupational safety and health laws. The scope of the organization's operations and therefore its risk profile will determine how the SMS is structured and what resources are required to manage occupational health and safety risk effectively. Some organizations may also have to dovetail other management system functions, such as process safety, environmental resource management or quality management together with safety management to meet both regulatory requirements, industry sector requirements and an organizations own internal and discretionary standard requirements.

Safety management should be considered as a part of the overall business management system of an organization and not an add-on to it. Increasingly, management standards across a range of business functions such as environment, quality and safety are now being designed so that these traditionally disparate elements can be integrated and managed within a single business management system and not as separate and stand-alone functions.

Due to the close association between health and safety, safety management systems (SMS) are also increasingly known as occupational health and safety management systems (OHSMS); these two terms can to the greater extent can be used interchangeably.

An SMS is only as good as its implementation – effective safety management means that organisations need to ensure they are looking at all the risks within the organization as a single system, rather than having multiple, competing, ‘Safety Management Silos.’ If safety is not seen holistically, it can interfere with the prioritization of improvements or even result in safety issues being missed. For example, after an explosion in March 2005 at BP's Texas City Refinery (BP) the investigation concluded that the company had put too much emphasis on personal safety thus ignoring the safety of their processes. The antidote to such silo thinking is the proper evaluation of all risks, a key aspect of an effective SMS.

Development of safety management standards

Industry sector standards
Over time, particular safety management models can become a preferred standard within an industry sector which is an approach often driven by industry representative bodies or trade associations. In industries where public safety is a prime consideration or where organisations operate in a high risk industry sector, specific regulations may be introduced which detail requirements that fit the industry risk profile, such as the OSHA requirement for a process safety management system.

Industry specific safety management include:
 The International Association of Oil & Gas Producers (IOGP) standard Operating Management System (OMS)  for the oil and gas industry, 
 The International Civil Aviation Organization has recommended that all aviation authorities implement SMS regulatory structures.
 Federal Aviation Authority - Safety Management System (SMS) for Airports - Guidance, Tools, & Related Information
 The European Aviation Safety Agency (EASA) began the process of implementing Safety Management System (SMS) regulations by issuing Terms of Reference (TOR) on July 18, 2011.

Regulatory requirements for a safety management system include:
 The International Maritime Organization (IMO) adopted the ISM Code in 2002 to provide an international standard for the safe management and operation of ships and for pollution prevention.
 Transport Canada’s Rail Safety Directorate incorporated SMS into the rail industry in 2001. The Rail Safety Management System requirements are set out in the Railway Safety Management System Regulations.
 Occupational Safety and Health Administration (OSHA) - The Process Safety Management of Highly Hazardous Chemicals standard (29 CFR 1910.119)

Independent safety management standards include:
 The American National Standards Institute and the American Society of Safety Professionals ANSI/ASSP Z10.0 standard helps to establish OSH management systems to improve employee safety, reduce workplace risks and create better working conditions. It is one of the most comprehensive systems-based standards for improving OSH performance and provides an architecture that each organization can customize to their individual needs.
 The International Organization for Standardization (ISO) ISO 45001:2018 - Occupational health and safety management systems specifies requirements for an occupational health and safety (OH&S) management system, and gives guidance for its use, to enable organizations to provide safe and healthy workplaces by preventing work-related injury and ill health, as well as by proactively improving its OH&S performance.

National and international standards
Many countries have developed national safety management models that have become adopted by organisations across a wide range of industries. National standards draw on experience and knowledge from a wide variety of organisations and individuals and can provide a uniform and consistent framework in which to work. In addition, such standards can be externally accessed and certified, which for many organisations is a very desirable goal.

These standards have a number of benefits:
 When widely used, they provide for a consistent approach to managing safety across a wide range of industries.
 When implemented, they result in improvements in safety performance, productivity and employee morale.
 Current and future legislation can be easily incorporated into the safety management system which promotes compliance. 
 As new systems develop, it is generally easier to migrate to a new system when an established system is already in place. 
 For certified systems, certification implies effective conformance to the standard.
 Many clients and customers see certification against a safety management system as an added value proposition.

The Occupational Health and Safety Assessment Series, commonly known as OHSAS 18001 series standard from 1999 was an attempt to consolidate and establish a definitive certifiable standard internationally, taking lessons and best practice from many national standards. It was widely adopted with a revision undertaken in 2007. The OHSAS Project Group was independent of the International Organization for Standardization (ISO). OHSAS 18001:2007 was withdrawn and replaced by the ISO standard ISO 45001:2018 Occupational health and safety management systems — Requirements with guidance for use''

One significant development that ISO 45001 has introduced is compatibility with the ISO 14001 environmental management and the ISO 9001 quality management standards.

See also
 ISO 45001
 International Organization for Standardization
 OHSAS 18001
 ALARP
 PDCA
 Corrective and preventive action
 International Labour Organization
 Trade union
 Process safety
 Occupational safety and health
 Factory Acts

References

Safety